Parliamentary elections were held in the Gambia on 17 January 2002. They were boycotted by several opposition parties, including the United Democratic Party. As a result, the ruling Alliance for Patriotic Reorientation and Construction of President Yahya Jammeh ran unopposed in 33 of the 48 elected seats, and won 12 of the 15 seats in which they had opposition.

In seats where there was a vote, turnout was 56.4%.

Results

References

2002 in the Gambia
Parliamentary elections in the Gambia
Gambia
January 2002 events in Africa
Election and referendum articles with incomplete results